Guangling District is one of three districts of Yangzhou, Jiangsu province, China. The district includes the eastern half of Yangzhou's main urban area (including Yangzhou's historic center within the former city wall), and the city's eastern suburbs. The other half of the city's main urban area is in Hanjiang District.

Administrative divisions
In the present, Guangling District has 4 subdistricts, 1 town and 1 township.
4 subdistricts

1 town
 Wantou

1 township
 Tangwang

Transportation
Yangzhou East railway station is located here.

References

www.xzqh.org

External links 

County-level divisions of Jiangsu
Yangzhou